This is a list of films directed or produced by Roger Corman.

This is a partial list. Corman is famously prolific, both in his American International Pictures years and afterward.  The IMDb credits Corman with 55 directed films and some 385 produced films from 1954 through 2008, many as un-credited producer or executive producer (consistent with his role as head of his own New World Pictures from 1970 through 1983). Corman also has significant credits as writer and actor.

Film

Producer only
{|class="wikitable"
|-
! Year
! Title
! Director
! Notes
|-
|rowspan=2| 1954
| Monster from the Ocean Floor 
| Wyott Ordung
|
|-
| The Fast and the Furious 
| Edward SampsonJohn Ireland
| Also story writer, stunt driver and 2nd unit director
|-
| 1958
| Night of the Blood Beast
| Bernard L. Kowalski
|
|-
| 1963
| Dementia 13 
| Francis Ford Coppola
|
|-
| 1965 
| Voyage to the Prehistoric Planet 
| Curtis Harrington
|
|-
| 1966
| Blood Bath 
| Jack HillStephanie Rothman
|
|-
| 1967
| Devil's Angels
| Daniel Haller
|
|-
| 1968
| Targets 
| Peter Bogdanovich
|
|-
| 1970
| The Dunwich Horror 
| Daniel Haller
|
|-
| 1972 
| Boxcar Bertha 
| Martin Scorsese
|
|-
| 1973
| Sweet Kill 
| Curtis Hanson
|
|-
|rowspan=3| 1974
| Caged Heat 
| Jonathan Demme
|
|-
| Cockfighter 
| Monte Hellman
|
|-
| The Arena 
| Steve CarverJoe D'Amato
|
|-
| 1975 
| Death Race 2000 
| Paul Bartel
|
|-
| 1976
| Fighting Mad
| Jonathan Demme
|
|-
|rowspan=2| 1977 
| Grand Theft Auto 
| Ron Howard
|
|-
| I Never Promised You a Rose Garden
| Anthony Page
|
|-
| 1978
| Piranha 
| Joe Dante
|
|-
| 1979 
| Rock 'n' Roll High School 
| Allan Arkush
|
|-
|rowspan=3| 1980 
| Battle Beyond the Stars 
| Jimmy T. Murakami
|
|-
| Galaxy of Terror 
| Bruce D. Clark
|
|-
| Smokey Bites the Dust
| Charles B. Griffith
|
|-
| 1982 
| Forbidden World 
| Allan Holzman
|
|-
|rowspan=2| 1983 
| Space Raiders 
| Howard R. Cohen
|
|-
| Suburbia 
| Penelope Spheeris
| Also presenter
|-
|rowspan=3|1987 
| Sweet Revenge 
| Mark Sobel
|
|-
| Slumber Party Massacre II| Deborah Brock
|
|-
| Munchies 
| Bettina Hirsch
|
|-
| 1988 
| Andy Colby's Incredible Adventure| Deborah Brock
|
|-
|rowspan=2|1989 
| Masque of the Red Death 
| Larry Brand
|
|-
| The Terror Within 
| Thierry Notz
|
|-
|rowspan=2| 1990
| Naked Obsession| Dan Golden
|
|-
| Slumber Party Massacre III 
| Sally Mattison
|
|-
| 1991
| The Unborn| Rodman Flender
|
|-
|rowspan=2| 1992 
| Killer Instinct| David Tausik
|
|-
| Munchie| Jim Wynorski
|
|-
|rowspan=3|1993 
| Carnosaur| Adam Simon
|
|-
| Dracula Rising| Fred Gallo
|
|- 
| The Skateboard Kid| Larry Swerdlove
|
|- 
|rowspan=4|1994
| The Unborn 2| Rick Jacobson
|
|-
| Angel of Destruction| Charles Philip Moore
|
|-
| Hellfire 
| Rick Jacobson
|
|-
| The Fantastic Four| Oley Sassone
| Unreleased|-
| 1995 
| Carnosaur 2| Louis Morneau
|
|-
| 1996 
| Carnosaur 3: Primal Species 
| Jonathan Winfrey
|
|-
| 1999
| The Shepherd| Peter Hayman
|
|-
| 2001 
| Raptor| Jim Wynorski
|
|-
| 2002 
| Escape from Afghanistan 
| Timur Bekmambetov
|
|-
| 2004 
| Dinocroc| Kevin O'Neill
| Also presenter
|-
|rowspan=2| 2006 
| The Hunt for Eagle One|rowspan=2| Brian Clyde
|
|-
| The Hunt for Eagle One: Crash Point|
|-
| 2007 
| Supergator|rowspan=2| Kevin O'Neill
|
|-
| 2012
| Attack of the 50 Foot Cheerleader|
|-
| 2014 
| Roger Corman's Operation Rogue 
| Brian Clyde
|
|-
| 2015
| Fist of the Dragon| Antony Szeto
|
|-
| 2017
| Death Race 2050| G.J. Echternkamp
|
|-
|}

Executive producer

TV movies
Producer

Executive producer

Acting roles

Unmade and unreleased filmsHigh Steel - a "steeplejack story" (1955)Cobra - a film to be shot in India in Cinemascope (1955) with Gaby BruyèreFortress Beneath the Sea - shot off Baja California (1955)The Kickback by John Robinson and Frank Burt
an adaptation of She by H. Rider Haggard for American International Pictures (late 1950s) - never made, although Corman got to travel overseas, scouting locationsDevil on Horseback - a Western based on the Brownsville Raid based on a script by Charles B. Griffith (1955)The Stake - a Western by George Leffert to star Dana AndrewsPart Time Mother - from a script by Charles B. GriffithThe Haunted Dream (circa 1961) - a biopic of Edgar Allan PoeI Flew a Spy Plane Over Russia (early 1960s) - based on the Francis Gary Powers incident with a script written by Robert Towne that Corman claims was not finished in time
a biopic on Robert E. Lee for United Artists (early 1960s)
an adaptation of Portrait of the Artist as a Young Man (mid-1960s) based on a script by Hugh Leonard for Columbia, which they did not want to make
an adaptation of Kafka's The Penal Colony for Columbia, to be shot on the set for King Rat (1965)
a script by novelist Richard Yates about the Battle of Iwo Jima (circa 1965)The Long Ride Home - a Western based on a script by Robert Towne (circa 1965)Couples - based on a novel by John Updike for United Artists (circa 1971)The Fantastic Four - a film produced by Corman, but never released (1993–94)

References
Citations

Bibliography

 Corman, Roger and Jim Jerome, How I Made a Hundred Movies in Hollywood and Never lost a Dime''. New York: Muller, 1990. .

External links
 Roger Corman at Allmovie
 

Corman, Roger
Corman, Roger
Corman, Roger